Erachakulam is a neighbourhood in Kanyakumari district of Tamil Nadu state in the peninsular India.

Nagercoil]], Boothapandi, Vadasery, Putheri, Thiruppathisaram and Thovalai are some of the important neighbourhoods of Erachakulam.

Amrita College of Engineering and Technology, a unit of Amrita Institutions, is situated in Erachakulam. A Government high school is located in Erachakulam. A medical camp is to be arranged on 14 February 2023, for the people of Erachakulam and its neighbouring areas, for the welfare of physically challenged.

Sandhana Mariamman Temple located in Erachakulam is under the control of Hindu Religious and Charitable Endowments Department, Government of Tamil Nadu. Udhaya Marthandeswarar Temple, Muppidathiamman Temple and Azhagiya Mannarsamy Temple are also situated in Erachakulam.

Erachakulam area falls under the Kanniyakumari Lok Sabha constituency. Vijay Vasanth is the incumbent member of its Lok Sabha constituency.

References

External link 
 GeoHack - Erachakulam

Nagercoil
Cities and towns in Kanyakumari district